The Dodda Aalada Mara(ದೊಡ್ಡ ಆಲದ ಮರ), literally translated to Big Banyan Tree, is a giant approximately 400-year-old banyan tree (Ficus benghalensis) located in the village of Kethohalli in the Bangalore Urban district of Karnataka, India. In the 2000s, the main root of the tree succumbed to natural disease, and thus the tree now looks like many different trees.

Tourism
Buses can be taken from Majestic to Kengeri and then from Kengeri to Doda Alada Mara. There are direct buses from K. R. Market to Dodda Alada mara which stops just beside the tree. The tree is the natural home of a large number of monkeys, and tourists are advised to be careful with food, water, camera bags, and anything else that can be snatched away.

Gallery

See also 
List of Banyan trees in India
List of individual trees
Tippagondanahalli Reservoir
Kanva reservoir
The Great Banyan
Savandurga

References

Tourist attractions in Bangalore
Flora of Karnataka
Individual banyan trees
Individual trees in India